Arthur Conrad Reinhart (May 29, 1899 - November 11, 1946) was a Major League Baseball pitcher from -.

Biography
Reinhart was in born in Ackley, Iowa, and attended the University of Iowa. He was a left-handed pitcher and pitched in the Texas League and other minor leagues.

Reinhart pitched for the St. Louis Cardinals from 1919 to 1928. He played in a total of 123 games, 45 as a starting pitcher. He had a record of 30 wins and 18 losses.

He was an exceptional hitting pitcher, compiling a .301 batting average (56-for-186) with 25 runs and 19 RBI. He recorded a .984 fielding percentage with only 2 errors in 122 total chances.

Reinhart died in Houston, Texas, and is interred at Oak Wood Cemetery in Ackley, Iowa.

References

External links

1899 births
1946 deaths
People from Ackley, Iowa
University of Iowa alumni
Major League Baseball pitchers
St. Louis Cardinals players
Baseball players from Iowa
Burials in Iowa